Neoblastobasis biceratala is a moth in the family Blastobasidae. It was described by Kyu-Tek Park in 1984. It is found in South Korea, Russia and Japan.

References

Blastobasidae
Moths described in 1984